Human Wheels is the twelfth studio album by American singer-songwriter John Mellencamp. Released on Mercury Records on September 7, 1993, it peaked at No. 7 on the Billboard 200. The single "What If I Came Knocking" was Mellencamp's last No. 1 single on the Album Rock Tracks chart, staying atop for two weeks in the summer of 1993. The album has been certified Platinum by the RIAA for sales of 1,000,000 copies. 

Entertainment Weekly gave the record an "A" rating, stating: "John Mellencamp's last album was more or less straight-ahead rock, but there's something dark and unshaven about his new one, 'Human Wheels.' Oddball instruments — pennywhistles, mandolins — pop up like disordered wraiths over gritty drum tracks that sound like they were recorded in a cluttered cellar. Mellencamp himself mutters and snarls in a voice of tangled complexity, worrying his way through songs about trouble."

Spin Magazine named Human Wheels the fifth best album of 1993.

Background
The title track was borne out of a poem Mellencamp's friend George Green wrote as a eulogy he delivered at the grave site upon the death of his grandfather. "He had no intention of using it as a song," Mellencamp said in a 2008 interview with the Bloomington Herald Times. "He had me read it and I said, 'These are the best lyrics you ever wrote.' He said, 'They're not lyrics' and I said, 'I can make them lyrics.' I took it and kind of cut it up and wrote the chorus." Mellencamp gave additional insight into the writing process of "Human Wheels" in a 2004 American Songwriter interview, saying: "I wrote that song without a guitar or anything. I just sang that melody. I figured out the cadence in my head, and then I went to my guitar to figure out the chords."

"To me, this record is very urban," Mellencamp told Billboard Magazine's Craig Rosen in a July 3, 1993 story. "We had a lot of discussions about the rhythm and blues music of the day. We explored what a lot of these current bands are doing—these young black bands that are doing more than just sampling.

"The rhythms in songs like 'Birmingham' or 'French Shoes' or 'Junior' are R&B, but to me R&B is the basic beat that propels the human body. Sly & the Family Stone also deserve a tip of hat here, because as a kid when I heard Sly sing 'hot fun at the country fair,' I said, 'Man, that's for me!' Years later, I saw that there was a lot more subtlety and intensity to his music than I first realized. And whether you hear the influence in Tone Loc or Arrested Development, Sly remains an undercredited inspiration in '90s rock 'n roll. He made street music, and I wanted things like 'Birmingham' to have the rhythm of the streets."

Of the lead track, "When Jesus Left Birmingham", Mellencamp told Billboard: "I wrote 'When Jesus Left Birmingham' in Amsterdam in 1992 after driving back at 2 a.m. from a concert we'd done down in The Hague. When we got to the hotel, it looked like Sodom and Gomorrah, with dozens of well-dressed businessmen all around the area picking up prostitutes and going wild. I thought, 'There's something wrong here: It's a Wednesday night, at an hour when anybody sane is asleep, and these people are just getting started!' It gave you the sense that there's no bottom line any more in anyone's behavior."

On the reflective "Sweet Evening Breeze," Mellencamp said in the liner notes to his 2010 box set On the Rural Route 7609: "Can you name another song that sounds like that? I think that song is beautifully produced and arranged."

The album is dedicated to band member John Cascella, who died unexpectedly about halfway through production of the album.

Promotion
Mercury Records utilized a unique (for the time period) two-tiered singles campaign to promote the album. They released "What if I Came Knocking" to radio in July 1993, and followed it up a month later with a second single, "Human Wheels", which charted at No. 48 on the Billboard Hot 100. "The whole idea came from Jimi Hendrix," Mellencamp told Billboard. "He put out a single, and said, 'I did pretty good with that one, let's make another one.' Then they made an album."

Track listing

Personnel
John Mellencamp – vocals, guitar
Kenny Aronoff – drums, percussion
David Grissom – guitars, mandolin, bass
Lisa Germano – violin, mandolin, penny whistle, zither, background vocals
Toby Myers – bass, background vocals
Pat Peterson – background vocals, accordion, maracas, co-lead vocals on "Case 795 (The Family)", "French Shoes"
Mike Wanchic – guitars, dobro, dulcimer, background vocals
Malcolm Burn – organ, guitar, harmonica, synthesizer
John Cascella – accordion, organ, background vocals, penny whistle, melodica
Janas Hoyt – harmony vocals

Charts

References

John Mellencamp albums
1993 albums
Albums produced by Malcolm Burn
Mercury Records albums
Albums produced by David Leonard (record producer)